White Lightning is a wooden roller coaster located at Fun Spot America amusement park in Orlando, Florida. Manufactured by Great Coasters International (GCI), White Lightning opened to the public on June 8, 2013, as the first wooden coaster to be built in Orlando. Unlike traditional wood designs, the support structure is made of steel to reduce maintenance costs, and it was the first time GCI incorporated the design into one of their coasters. White Lightning has also been well-received, consistently ranking in the top 50 among wooden roller coasters in the annual Golden Ticket Awards from Amusement Today.

History
On December 31, 2010, Fun Spot Action Park announced that they purchased an additional  adjacent to the park, with plans to triple the size of the park adding a number of new rides. In April 2011, Fun Spot Action Park surveyed park guests about what types of attractions they would like at the park. Consensus published by the park indicated they wanted water rides and roller coasters. In August 2011, the Orlando Sentinel revealed that the park had contacted at least three roller coaster manufacturers. In November 2011, it was confirmed that the park would receive two roller coasters: one wood and one steel. The wooden roller coaster was later confirmed to be a family friendly roller coaster manufactured by Great Coasters International (GCI).

In May 2012, Fun Spot Action Park announced on Theme Park Review that they would be adding White Lighting in 2013 as part of their expansion and rebranding. However, due to the availability of extra funding, the park was able incorporate more thrilling elements in the ride. After a one-year period of construction, White Lightning soft opened to the public on May 20, 2013. The park's official reopening ceremony was held on June 8, 2013. The $3.5 million ride opened as Orlando's first wooden roller coaster.

In September 2020, a small part of White Lightning was retracked with new prototype steel Titan Track by Great Coasters International.

Characteristics

White Lightning is a wooden roller coaster designed by Pennsylvania-based manufacturer, Great Coasters International (GCI). The  ride takes riders to a height of  through the use of a chain lift hill. The ride operates with two Millennium Flyer trains. Each train is made up of six cars that seat pairs of riders. This is shorter than most GCI trains and allows for a faster paced ride.

The wooden-tracked ride features steel supports, a first for GCI. Traditionally manufacturers would attach the track directly to steel supports. The steel support structure was requested by the park because it would require less maintenance than a wooden one, and it could be powder-coated to stand out in the park.

Ride experience

White Lightning begins with a small dip out of the station and into the chain lift hill. Once at the top of the  hill, the ride plunges  to the left at an angle of 58°. The train then traverses a small high speed hill, before entering a double up followed by a double down. The train then inclines into a 90° banked curve that dives back to the ground, sending riders back in the direction they came. Several small hills lead the ride to the final brake run and subsequently the station.

Reception
White Lightning has been well received. Dewayne Bevil of the Orlando Sentinel stated the ride had "several 'Wow, this is fun' moments". Bevil described the ride as "smooth sailing" when compared to other wooden roller coasters, praising the ride for its many twists and air-time hills. Robb Alvey of Theme Park Review described the ride as "fast and fun" and that one shouldn't "judge it by its size". David Martin of WOFL stated he loved the ride and that the ride was a hit. Paul Ruben of Park World Magazine stated the ride is "not too big and it's not too small. It's just right." John Arie, the owner of Fun Spot, stated GCI delivered a ride that exceed his expectations, giving it an 11 out of 10.

See also
 Fun Spot America Theme Parks
 Freedom Flyer
 Mine Blower

References

External links
 

Family roller coasters
Out and back roller coasters
Roller coasters in Orlando, Florida
Roller coasters in Florida
Roller coasters introduced in 2013
Roller coasters manufactured by Great Coasters International
Wooden roller coasters